Vasilios Rovas (born 6 January 1984) is a Greek former professional footballer who played as a defensive midfielder.

Career

His first football steps made to Proodeftiki. Then Atromitos for three years, where he was most of the time, a key member of the lineup. In 2009, he signed to Aris, but failed to establish itself as a key and so was loaned PAS Giannina in the second half of season 2009–10. In August 2010 he went to OFI, where there was large contributor to the team. In January 2012 he moved to Panionios. There he stayed until December of that year, when he decided to leave to try his luck abroad, but the agreement with the team abroad was not completed, so continue career at Apollon Smyrni, who at the end of the season was crowned champion B 'National Division and promoted to the Super League. On 1 July 2013, having remained free from Apollon, announced he's agreement with AEK, in his first year he participated in 18 league matches, while the second 16. In September 2015, after five years absence, he returned to Aris

Honours
AEK Athens
Football League: 2014–15 (South Group)
Football League 2: 2013–14 (6th Group)

References

External links

Profile at epae.org
Profile at Onsports.gr
Guardian Football

1984 births
Living people
Greek footballers
Super League Greece players
Football League (Greece) players
Proodeftiki F.C. players
Niki Volos F.C. players
Atromitos F.C. players
Aris Thessaloniki F.C. players
PAS Giannina F.C. players
OFI Crete F.C. players
Panionios F.C. players
Apollon Smyrnis F.C. players
AEK Athens F.C. players
Association football midfielders
Footballers from Karditsa